A stamp dealer is a company or an individual who deals in stamps and philatelic products. It also includes individuals who sell postage stamps for day to day use or revenue stamps for use on court documents. Stamp dealers who sell to stamp collectors and philatelists are of many kinds and their businesses range from small home operations to large international companies.

Methods of sale

Dealers may sell by mail order, at stamp fairs, at their own retail premises, through postal auctions or by sending packets of stamps on approval to collectors. Increasingly, dealers sell on internet auction sites like eBay or Delcampe. Dealers also vary in the type of material they handle, ranging from a general stock to highly specialised firms who only trade in particular countries or topical areas.

Stamp catalogues

Stamp catalogues principally evolved from stamp dealer's price lists, though today most stamp catalogues no longer represent a retail price list. The Stanley Gibbons catalogue is an exception that, in principle, still shows the price at which they would sell a particular stamp over the counter at their London shop, or by mail order, if they had it in stock and it was in the exact condition outlined in the notes at the start of the catalogue. In practice, many items are not in stock, or are not in the same condition, or the price at which the stamp is for sale differs for some other reason from that shown in the catalogue. The Gibbons catalogue was originally published as a penny price list in November 1865.

Size of the market 
Unlike some other markets, such as stocks and shares, the majority of transactions in the philatelic or stamp market take place informally, by mail order or in retail environments, and therefore the size of the market is difficult to determine. It has been estimated at £5 Billion. In a 2007 interview, Mike Hall of Stanley Gibbons estimated that "About $1 billion of rare stamps trade annually in the $10 billion-a-year stamp market." The number of collectors worldwide was estimated at 30 million in 2004. In 2009, Adrian Roose of Stanley Gibbons estimated the figure at 48 million including 18 million in China. It is not known how many of these are serious collectors.

See also
Philatelic investment

References

External links

Stamp dealers of Great Britain – postalstationery.org.uk

 
Philatelic terminology